Omar Hasan oglu Eldarov is an Azerbaijani monumentalist sculptor, Honoured Art Worker of Azerbaijan (1962), People's Artist of Azerbaijan (1982), full member of the National Academy of Sciences of Azerbaijan (2001), full member of the Russian Academy of Arts (1988), president of Azerbaijan State Academy of Fine Arts (2001), and academician.

Creativity of Soviet period
Omar Eldarov was born on December 21, 1927 in Derbent, Dagestan ASSR.

From 1942 to 1945 studied at Azerbaijan State Art School named after Azim Azimzade. In 1951, graduated from the Institute of Painting, Sculpture and Architecture named after I.Y.Repin. Was the student of such great masters as A.T.Matveyev, M.A.Kerzin, V.B.Pinchuk.

In 1980, he was awarded the USSR State Prize for monument-ensemble to Sadriddin Ayni in Dushanbe (1979). Omar Eldarov is the holder of the "Order of the Badge of Honour". He was awarded the State Prize of the Azerbaijan SSR for the monument to P.A.Dzhaparidze in Baku (1980). The most famous works of the master are-monument to Fizuli in Baku (1962), with the sculptor Tokay Mammadov), for which he was awarded silver medal of the USSR Academy of Arts; monument to Natavan (1960), Baku, with architects E.Ismayilov and F.Leontyev); Monument to Sattar Bahlulzade (1975); conductor Niyazi's portrait (1984); "Head of laughing worker" (1984); "Mahatma Gandhi" (1987); "Avicenna" (1980); Rabindranath Tagore (1987); portraits of Aysel (1988), Ayten (1988).

Creativity (1991-up till now)
The author of Sattar Bahlulzade's portrait, Muslim Mogomayev's bust, monument to Huseyn Javid (1993), monument to Mammed Amin Rasulzade (1995), Azim Azimzade (2002), Rashid Behbudov's bas-relief (2002), Nizami Ganjavi's bust in Cheboksary (2004), gravestones of Zarifa Aliyeva, Haydar Aliyev, Sikh-Ali Gurbanov, Tofig Guliyev in the Alley of Honorable Burial in Baku, gravestone and bas-relief of Uzeyir Hajibeyov in Vienna (2005), Niyazi's bas-relief (2006), monument to Haydar Aliyev in Nakhchivan (2006), monument to İhsan Doğramacı in Ankara (2003), memorial plaque of Tofig Guliyev (2006), memorial plaques of Haydar Aliyev and academician Zarifa Aliyeva (2008).

Omar Eldarov was awarded "Gold medal" for the contribution and development of Azerbaijani visual arts during solemn ceremonies dedicated to 65th  anniversary of the Azerbaijan Artists Union. He was awarded commemorative medal "For merits for Academy in honor of 250th anniversary", in the honor of 250th anniversary of the Russian Academy of Arts [2007).

From 1995 to 2000, Omar Eldarov was the deputy of parliament- the National Assembly of Azerbaijan. Married, has three children: daughters-Lala Eldarova (art critic), the Institute of Arts and Architecture of the National Academy of Sciences of Azerbaijan, Kamilla Eldarova (painter), son-Muslim Eldarov (sculptor, publisher of the State book of Azerbaijan-2002, magazine "Caspian").

References

1927 births
Living people
20th-century Azerbaijani sculptors
21st-century Azerbaijani sculptors
Azerbaijani academics
Azerbaijani people of Dagestani descent
People from Derbent
Omar Eldarov